Zhulin (masculine) or Zhulina (Жулинa, feminine) is a Russian surname that may refer to
Alexander Zhulin (born 1963), Russian ice dancing coach and former competitor
Deniss Žuļins (Denis Zhulin, born 1982), Latvian weightlifter
Valentina Zhulina (born 1953), Soviet rower

See also
Zhilin (disambiguation)

Russian-language surnames